Biryulyovskaya line or Line 18 of the Moscow Metro is a line under construction since 2021   and will end in 2027. In the future, it will be connected with Rublyovo-Arkhangelskaya line.

Stations

References 

Moscow Metro lines